James or Jimmy Inglis may refer to:

James Charles Inglis (1851–1911), British civil engineer
James Inglis (evangelist) (1813–1872), American preacher and editor
James Inglis (murderer) (1922–1951), Scottish man executed for murder
James Inglis (physician) (1813–1851), Scottish physician, author and geologist
James Inglis (politician) (1845–1908), writer and politician in colonial New South Wales
James Inglis, of the Inglis baronets
Jimmy Inglis (footballer, born 1872), Scottish footballer
Jimmy Inglis (footballer, born 1951), Scottish footballer
James Inglis (rugby union) (born 1986), English rugby union player for Harlequins
James Inglis (tailor), Scottish tailor who served James VI of Scotland